Craugastor underwoodi is a species of frog in the family Craugastoridae.
It is found in Costa Rica and Panama.
Its natural habitats are subtropical or tropical moist lowland forests, subtropical or tropical moist montane forests, pastureland, plantations, and heavily degraded former forest.

References

underwood
Frogs of North America
Amphibians of Costa Rica
Amphibians of Panama
Amphibians described in 1896
Taxonomy articles created by Polbot